Peremoha may refer to:

Peremoha (Kharkiv Metro), 30th station of the Kharkiv Metro
Peremoha, Kharkiv Raion
FC Peremoha Dnipro, football club
Peremoha Stadium, main stadium of Kamianske, Ukraine